Dennis Hoey  (born Samuel David Hyams, 30 March 1893 – 25 July 1960) was a British film and stage actor, best known for playing Inspector Lestrade in six films of Universal's Sherlock Holmes series.

Early life
Hoey was born Samuel David Hyams in London to Russian-Jewish parents, another source says Irish and Russian-Jewish parents, who earned a living by running a bed and breakfast in Brighton, on the coast of the English county of East Sussex. He received his formal education at Brighton College, and originally planned to be a teacher.

He served in the British Army during World War I. After a career as a singer, which included entertaining British troops during his war service, Hoey moved into theatre-acting in 1918, and later into cinema films. In 1931 he moved to the United States, and commenced a career in Hollywood.

Film
Hoey's first film was Tell England. He is best known for playing Inspector Lestrade in six Universal's Sherlock Holmes series. He also portrayed the master of Harrow in The Foxes of Harrow and appeared in Tarzan and the Leopard Woman.

Stage
Hoey "appeared frequently in London" stage productions, including those of Sydney Carroll's Shakespearean repertory company. He played Mr. Rochester opposite Katharine Hepburn in the American production of Helen Jerome's stage adaptation of Jane Eyre. He also wrote a play called The Haven and toured in it in 1946 with Melville Cooper, Valerie Cossart and Viola Roache.

Hoey's Broadway credits include Hassan (1924), Katja (1926–1927), Green Waters (1936), Virginia (1937), Empress of Destiny (1938), The Circle (1938), Lorelei (1938), The Burning Deck (1940), Heart of a City (1942), The Haven (1946), and Getting Married (1951).

Radio
On radio, Hoey played Mr. Welby in Pretty Kitty Kelly on CBS.

Personal life
Issue No. 45 of "Films of the Golden Age" magazine features an interview with Hoey's son Michael A. Hoey (1934–2014), who extensively discusses Dennis Hoey's early life, career, marriages and death. In his book, "Elvis, Sherlock and Me: How I Survived Growing Up in Hollywood" (Bear Manor Media-2007) he discusses his father's career and their sometimes turbulent relationship.

Death
Hoey died at the age of 67 in Palm Beach, Florida, of kidney disease on 25 July 1960. His body was buried at Myrtle Hill Memorial Park cemetery, in Tampa, Florida.

Filmography

 Tip Toes (1927) as Hotelier (film debut)
 The Man from Chicago (1930) as Jimmy Donovan
 Tell England (1931) as The Padre
 Never Trouble Trouble (1931) as Stranger
 Love Lies (1932) as Cyrus Watt
 Life Goes On (1932) as Anthony Carlisle
 The Maid of the Mountains (1932) as Orsino 
 Baroud (1933) as Captain Sabry
 The Good Companions (1933) as Joe Brundit
 The Wandering Jew (1933) as Lord de Beaudricourt
 Maid Happy (1933) as Sir Rudolph Bartlett
 Facing the Music (1933) as Capradossi 
 My Old Duchess (1934) as Montagu Neilson
 Lily of Killarney (1934) as Miles-Na-Copaleen
 Chu Chin Chow (1934) as Rakham, chief henchman
 I Spy (1934) as MNT
 Jew Süss (1934) as Dieterle
 Brewster's Millions (1935) as Mario
 Immortal Gentleman (1935) as Soldier/Toby Belch
 Honeymoon for Three (1935) as Mons Daumery
 The Tunnel (1935) as Worker (uncredited)
 The Mystery of the Mary Celeste (1935) as Tom Goodschard
 Maria Marten, or The Murder in the Red Barn (1935) as Gambling Winner
 Black Roses (1935) as Nikander
 Uncivilised (1937) as Mara the White Chief
 A Yank in the R.A.F. (1941) as Intelligence Officer
 Confirm or Deny (1941) as Duffield, Ministry of Information
 Son of Fury: The Story of Benjamin Blake (1942) as Lord Tarrant
 This Above All (1942) as Parsons
 Cairo (1942) as Colonel Woodhue
 Sherlock Holmes and the Secret Weapon (1942) as Inspector Lestrade
 Forever and a Day (1943) as Mover
 Frankenstein Meets the Wolf Man (1943) as Inspector Owen
 They Came to Blow Up America (1943) as Col. Taeger
 Bomber's Moon (1943) as Colonel von Grunow
 Sherlock Holmes Faces Death (1943) as Inspector Lestrade
 The Spider Woman (1944) as Inspector Lestrade
 Uncertain Glory (1944) as Father Le Clerc
 The Pearl of Death (1944) as Inspector Lestrade
 National Velvet (1944) as Mr. Greenford
 The Keys of the Kingdom (1944) as Alec Chisholm (uncredited)
 Sherlock Holmes and the House of Fear (1945) as Inspector Lestrade
 A Thousand and One Nights (1945) as Sultan Kamar Al-Kir/Prince Hadji
 Kitty (1945) as Mr. Jonathan Selby
 Tarzan and the Leopard Woman (1946) as Commissioner
 Terror by Night (1946) as Inspector Lestrade
 She-Wolf of London (1946) as Inspector Pierce
 Anna and the King of Siam (1946) as Sir Edward
 Roll on Texas Moon (1946) as Cole Gregory
 The Strange Woman (1946) as Tim Hager
 The Crimson Key (1947) as Steven Loring
 Second Chance (1947) as Roger Elwood
 Golden Earrings (1947) as Hoff
 The Foxes of Harrow (1947) as Master of Harrow
 Christmas Eve (1947) as Williams-Butler
 Where There's Life (1947) as Minister of War Grubitch
 If Winter Comes (1947) as Tiny Wilson
 Ruthless (1948) as Mr. Burnside
 Joan of Arc (1948) as Sir William Glasdale
 Wake of the Red Witch (1948) as Captain Munsey
 Bad Men of Tombstone (1949) as Mr. Smith
 The Secret Garden (1949) as Mr. Pitcher
 The Kid from Texas (1950) as Major Harper
 The Adventures of Ellery Queen (1950, TV) as Ronny Sinclair 
 David and Bathsheba (1951) as Joab
 Caribbean Gold (1952) as Burford
 Plymouth Adventure (1952) as Head Constable (final film, uncredited)
 Omnibus (1956, TV) as Arthur Conan Doyle

Stage
 Hassan (1924), Masrur
 Katja (1926), Ivo
 Green Waters (1936), Ian McRuvie
 Jane Eyre (1936), Mr. Rochester
 Virginia (1937), Sir Guy Carleton
 Empress of Destiny (1938), Potemkin
 The Circle (1938), Lord Porteous
 Lorelei (1938), Reprecht Eisenkranz
 The Burning Deck (1940), Captain Applegate
 Heart of a City (1942), Leo Saddle
 The Haven (1946), Edmund Durward
 Getting Married (1951), The General

References

External links

1893 births
1960 deaths
British male film actors
British male stage actors
British expatriate male actors in the United States
English people of Russian-Jewish descent
British Army personnel of World War I
Male actors from London
20th-century British male actors